Lomira is a village in Dodge County, Wisconsin, United States. The population was 2,430 at the 2010 census. The village is located within the Town of Lomira, at the crossroads of State Highways 49, 67 and 175, and Interstate 41.

History

The early history of the Village of Lomira is closely interwoven with the Town of Lomira. Prior to the arrival of white settlers, the son of Chief Black Hawk supposedly camped in the vicinity while blazing a trail from Milwaukee to Green Bay. There is no record of a settlement at Lomira prior to 1849. It was originally called Springfield, but in 1849, the name was changed to Lomira. Local lore says the village is a namesake of Elmira Schoonover, daughter of Sam Schoonover, an early settler. The first Post Office was established on May 11, 1849.

A petition for incorporation of the village of Lomira was made to the circuit court of Dodge County on March 24, 1899. The petition described the designated territory of "433 residents" as "containing a large number of stores, saloons, residences, elevators, hotels, blacksmith shops, cheese factory, planing mill and other places of business, and that the same is a railroad station." Copies of the petition were posted in the saloons of F. Kauper and Peter Greiten, and in the store and office of Peter Wolf, "all of which said places are public places." Petitioners presented the incorporation order at a special term of the circuit court held in the city of Waukesha, Wisconsin on 9 May 1899. Records of the public election on June 3, 1899 show 104 ballots were cast, of which 58 were for incorporation and 45 against.

Geography
Lomira is located at  (43.595089, -88.444602).

Lomira is commonly recognized by residents as being in the center of the triangle, with the three points of the triangle being Milwaukee, Green Bay, and Madison, each being roughly an hour long drive from Lomira.

Demographics

2010 census
As of the census of 2010, there were 2,430 people, 1,002 households, and 639 families residing in the village. The racial makeup of the village was 95.2% White, 0.7% African American, 0.5% Native American, 0.3% Asian, 1.7% from other races, and 1.6% from two or more races. Hispanic or Latino of any race were 4.6% of the population.

There were 1,002 households, of which 30.6% had children under the age of 18 living with them, 49.1% were married couples living together, 9.2% had a female householder with no husband present, 5.5% had a male householder with no wife present, and 36.2% were non-families. 29.6% of all households were made up of individuals, and 8.8% had someone living alone who was 65 years of age or older. The average household size was 2.39 and the average family size was 2.96.

The median age in the village was 36.7 years. 24.7% of residents were under the age of 18; 9.3% were between the ages of 18 and 24; 28.5% were from 25 to 44; 25% were from 45 to 64; and 12.4% were 65 years of age or older. The gender makeup of the village was 50.3% male and 49.7% female.

2000 census
As of the census of 2000, there were 2,233 people, 846 households, and 583 families residing in the village. The population density was 1,148.8 people per square mile (444.4/km2). There were 899 housing units at an average density of 462.5 per square mile (178.9/km2). The racial makeup of the village was 98.16% White, 0.36% Black or African American, 0.31% Native American, 0.13% Asian, 0.76% from other races, and 0.27% from two or more races. 2.55% of the population were Hispanic or Latino of any race.

There were 846 households, out of which 39.6% had children under the age of 18 living with them, 55.2% were married couples living together, 9.7% had a female householder with no husband present, and 31.0% were non-families. 25.4% of all households were made up of individuals, and 8.5% had someone living alone who was 65 years of age or older. The average household size was 2.58 and the average family size was 3.11.

In the village, the population was spread out, with 29.3% under the age of 18, 9.0% from 18 to 24, 32.6% from 25 to 44, 16.9% from 45 to 64, and 12.3% who were 65 years of age or older. The median age was 32 years. For every 100 females, there were 100.1 males. For every 100 females age 18 and over, there were 94.7 males.

The median income for a household in the village was $46,522, and the median income for a family was $52,600. Males had a median income of $36,440 versus $24,286 for females. The per capita income for the village was $20,256. About 3.1% of families and 3.9% of the population were below the poverty line, including 4.3% of those under age 18 and 6.7% of those age 65 or over.

Transportation
Lomira is at the crossroads of State Highways 49, 67 and 175, and Interstate 41. The Canadian National Railroad provides industrials rail service for business and industry. Commercial air transportation is offered in Appleton,  to the north; Milwaukee,  to the south; and Oshkosh,  to the north.

Education
The  School District of Lomira includes the villages of Brownsville Lomira, and Theresa, the hamlet of Knowles, and all or portions of the towns of Ashford, Byron, and Eden in Fond du Lac County; Leroy, Lomira and Theresa in Dodge County; and Wayne in Washington County. The Lomira School District has two elementary schools, one in Lomira, a part of the single K-12th grade building, and the other in Theresa. The student population of the high school is 355.  Lomira has one parochial school: St. John's Lutheran School (WELS). The Consolidated Catholic School Lomira-Theresa (CCLT) closed at the conclusion of the 2009–10 school year. In February 2013 district residents were surveyed about plans for the schools. The majority of respondents indicated a preference for significant upgrades to the district's schools, including a new gymnasium for the high school, relocation of the high school football field, new classrooms in the high school, and an additional cafeteria, kitchen, and district offices.

Business and industry
Lomira is in an agricultural area, which is reflected in the nature of many of the businesses in the village. In 1985, printing became a significant presence with the opening of the Quad Graphics production plant, the largest single printing facility in the Western Hemisphere. In 2007 Kondex Corporation, a farm machinery and equipment manufacturer, opened a facility in a newly created industrial park. The small village also has 5 restaurants, 4 gas stations, 2 car dealerships, and several bars.

Religion

Notable residents
Josh Bilicki, NASCAR driver
Aaron Cain, popular wood craftsman
Tim Michels, businessman

Images

References

 Kietzer, Jane. Lomira Through the Years, 1899-1999. Fond du Lac, WI: Action Publications, 1999. This history book, compiled by a long-time resident, was prepared for the 100th anniversary celebration of the Village of Lomira.
 Lomira: Yesterday, Today, and Tomorrow, 1976. This history booklet, compiled by long-time resident Virginia Sterr, was prepared for the Lomira celebration honoring our nation's bicentennial.

External links

 Village of Lomira
 Lomira School District.
 Lomira Chamber of Commerce

Villages in Wisconsin
Villages in Dodge County, Wisconsin
Populated places established in 1849
1849 establishments in Wisconsin